Brian Joseph Finneran (born January 31, 1976) is a former American football wide receiver in the National Football League. He was signed by  the Seattle Seahawks as an undrafted free agent in 1998 and also played for the Barcelona Dragons, Philadelphia Eagles and Atlanta Falcons. He played college football at Villanova.

Early years
Finneran attended Santa Margarita Catholic High School in Rancho Santa Margarita, California, and finished his three-year career there with a school career-record 177 receptions. Finneran received scholarship offers to play college football for the Oregon Ducks and Oregon State Beavers. However, the only school to offer a football scholarship to both Finneran and his twin brother was Villanova.

College career
Finneran and his identical twin brother, Brad, played college football for Villanova University and were lettermen. As a senior, Finneran had 96 receptions for 1,389 yards, earning All-American honors from the Associated Press and being awarded the Walter Payton Award, which is given to the nation's top Division I-AA offensive player. He had 265 receptions for 3,872 yards and 34 touchdowns over his entire college career. He had his number 25 jersey retired by Villanova in the fall of 2003.

Professional career
Prior to joining the Falcons, Finneran played for the NFL Europa Barcelona Dragons where he was named All-NFL Europe.  After coming to America and joining the Falcons, he proved to be a consistent possession receiver. Finneran tore ligaments in his left knee during Falcons practice on July 30, 2006, and missed the entire 2006 season. He missed his second straight season after tearing the reconstructed anterior cruciate ligament in his left knee. Before injuries forced him to miss the previous two seasons, he was the preferred target of quarterback Michael Vick despite generally starting in the slot receiver position. He returned to the field in 2008 but did not start and saw limited action. He was re-signed to a one-year contract on February 11, 2010.

Personal
Brian is married to Erin, and they have four children: Conor, Brynn, Keenan, and Cullen. He is one of the five hosts on The Locker Room, a morning sports talk show on WCNN 680 The Fan in Atlanta. Finneran also has one of the most powerful and sought-after cards in the Ultimate Team portion of the video game Madden 25 due to him being listed as 6'7", two inches taller than his actual height. He is also currently an ambassador for USA Football. Finneran made another appearance in Madden 16 as a special "Legends" card available in Ultimate Team and Draft Champions modes, this time at the correct height.  The Madden 16 legends card has an overall rating of 91. Finneran received cards of 96 and 99 Overalls that year, the latter being a special "Throwback" to Madden 25. Finneran returned once again to Madden 21 in 2020, with a 93 overall in Ultimate Team.

He made his television color commentary debut on April 2, 2016, for the Villanova Team Stream on TruTV for the 2016 Men's Basketball Final Four.

References

External links
 Atlanta Falcons bio

1976 births
Living people
Sportspeople from Mission Viejo, California
American football return specialists
American football wide receivers
Villanova Wildcats football players
Atlanta Falcons players
Philadelphia Eagles players
Players of American football from California
Barcelona Dragons players
Walter Payton Award winners
Ed Block Courage Award recipients